Cyrille Fagat Tchatchet II (born 1 August 1995) is a Cameroon-born British weightlifter. He competed in the 85 kg weight category at the 2014 Commonwealth Games at the Cameroon team and finished fifth.

He took up weightlifting at the age of 14.
He also competed at the British senior weightlifting and under-23 championship 2016 where he was third and first respectively. He won the British, English and BUCS weightlifting championships 2017, 2018 and 2019. In June 2021, he was selected to represent the Refugee Olympic Team in weightlifting.

On the 5th April 2022, Cyrille was cleared by the International Weightlifting Federation to represent British Weight Lifting at international competitions and the England at the Commonwealth GameS. His first international competition as a British weightlifter was the 2022 European Weightlifting Championships in Tirana, Albania.

Early life
Cyrille comes from a family of six children and is the 3rd born. His mother separated with his father in the year 2000 and Cyrille and his siblings were looked after by their mother who is a business woman. He attended Government Bilingual Practising High School in Yaoundé and started studying for a degree in geography at the University of Yaounde before stopping to focus full-time on weightlifting training to prepare for the Commonwealth Games.

Weightlifting career

Cyrille took up weightlifting at the age of 14 after seeing the picture of his cousin's father who was a weightlifter representing Cameroon. He therefore started training at Golden weightlifting club before switching to WOCA weightlifting club.

Personal life

Cyrille moved to the United Kingdom in 2014 and obtained refugee status in 2016. He decided to pursue a BSc Mental Health Nursing degree at Middlesex University after experiencing mild depression while claiming asylum, and now works as a mental health nurse.

Major results

References

External links 

Records set at 2019 British Championships

Weightlifters at the 2014 Commonwealth Games
Commonwealth Games competitors for Cameroon
Cameroonian male weightlifters
Sportspeople from Yaoundé
1995 births
Living people
Weightlifters at the 2020 Summer Olympics
Refugee Olympic Team at the 2020 Summer Olympics